Thirumagal is a 2020 Indian-Tamil-language Family Supernatural Soap opera television series, that premiered on 12 October 2020 on Sun TV and it is available for worldwide streaming on Sun NXT. The main plot of the story is taken from Telugu language serial 'Atho Athamma Kuthuro' aired on Gemini TV, however it has a different narration later.

The Show produced by T. G. Thyagarajan and Selvi Thyagarajan under Sun Entertainment and Sathya Jyothi Films, it stars Harika Sadu and Surendar Shanmugam.

Premise
The show focuses on Anjali who was swapped at birth into a middle-class family. She and Aishwarya do not get along with each other, with both unaware that they are related.

Cast

Main
 Harika sadu as Anjali Raja (Raja's Wife) (Aishwarya and Parameshwaran's daughter)
 Surender Shanmugam as Rajakumaran "Raja" (Bhavani and Chandrasekhar 's son)
 Shamitha Shreekumar replacement Rekha Krishnappa replacement Sirija as Aishwarya Parameshwaran (Parameshwaran's wife), Anjali 's Mother

Recurring Cast
 Jeeva Ravi as Parameshwaran, Anjali's Father 
 Revathy Sankar as Rajalakshmi Jameen Amma, Paramesh Mother 
 Janaki Devi replacement Nisha as Gowri Kesavan, Aishwarya Sis-in-law
 Rithika Tamil Selvi replacement VJ Thara replacement Gracy Thangavel as Magathi, Kesavan and Gowri Daughter
 Prakash Rajan as Kesavan, Aishwarya Brother (deceased)
 Sangeetha V as Sulokshana Manikandan, Parameshwaran's Sister 
 Kovai Babu as Manikandan, Sulokshana Husband 
 Sushma Nair replacement Nivedhitha as Pragathi Jayaram, Sulokshana and Mani Daughter
 Karthik as Jayaram 'Jai', Prgathi Husband, Fake Jameen Heir 
 Rajendran replacement Soodhu Kavvum Sivakumar as Chandrasekhar, Raja Father
 Rekha Suresh as Bhavani Chandrashekhar, Raja Mother
 Venkat Subha as Jameen Sathyamurthy Ayya, Paramesh Father
 Jeevitha as Anandavalli, Vanamadevi's Daughter 
 Anuradha as Vanamadevi, Rajalakshmi Sister 
 Meesai Rajendran as Vanamadevi's Husband 
 Banumathi as Nurse Nalini 
 Sangeetha Balan as Panbarasi 
 Sidharth Kapilavayi as Sadaiyandi (Malayan) 
 Sindhu as Nallamma, Azhagi Relative 
 Revathy A as Chellamma, Azhagi Relative

Special appearances
 Nakshatra Nagesh as herself 
 Nisha Ganesh as herself
 Ganesh Venkatraman as himself

Production

Casting
Actor Surender Shanmugam was selected to portray the lead role as Rajakumaran. Telugu TV actress Harika made her Tamil TV debut with the series by playing as Anjali. Shamitha Shreekumar was selected to portray the leading role and main antagonist as Aishwarya but was replaced by Rekha Krishnappa and later then was replaced by Sirija.

Adaptations

Dubbed Version

References

External links 
 

Sun TV original programming
Tamil-language romance television series
2020 Tamil-language television series debuts
Tamil-language television series based on Telugu-language television series
Tamil-language television soap operas
Television shows set in Tamil Nadu